This is a list of countries by gross domestic product (GDP) sector composition.

By economic sector

Nominal GDP sector composition 
Nominal GDP sector composition, 2015 (in percentage and in millions of dollars):

Real GDP sector composition
GDP sector composition, 2017 (in percentage and in millions of dollars):

Nominal GDP sector composition (2005 constant prices)
Nominal GDP sector composition, 2015 (in millions of 2005 USD): 2005 prices are used similarly to 2010 constant prices in which they provide economic statistics where inflation is accounted for.

GDP from natural resources
Source: World Development Indicators: Contribution of natural resources to gross domestic product (2011, source is unavailable)

List by alphabetical order

GDP (PPP) per person employed by sector
GDP (PPP) per person employed by sector, 2015:

References

Sources
GDP (nominal):	International Monetary Fund, World Economic Outlook Database, April 2012: Nominal GDP list of countries. Data for the year 2012. - IMF
GDP Sector composition: Field Listing - GDP composition by sector. - CIA World Factbook

Lists of countries by GDP-based indicators